Federal Highway 132 (Carretera Federal 132) connects Ecatepec de Morelos, State of Mexico in the west to Tulancingo, Hidalgo in the east.

References

132